Loaita Island also known as Kota Island (Mandarin , and ), with an area of  -- is the tenth largest of the naturally-occurring Spratly Islands, and the fifth largest of the Philippine-occupied islands.

The island is administered by the Philippines as part of Kalayaan, Palawan.

The island is also claimed by the People's Republic of China, the Republic of China (Taiwan) and Vietnam.

Environment
The island fringes the Loaita Bank, shoals and reefs. Its calcarenite outcrop is visible along its western side at low tide. The present shape of the island indicates sand buildup along its eastern side. The anchor-shaped side will eventually connect with the northern portion as the sand buildup continues, thereby creating another mini-lagoon in the process. The presence of migrating sea birds adds to the high phosphorus content of the island's sand. Occasionally, giant sea turtles lay their eggs on the island. The island is covered with mangrove bushes, above which rise coconut palms and other small trees.

History

On 22 May 1963, a sovereignty stele was rebuilt on Loaita Island by crew members of the three vessels Huong Giang, Chi Lang and Ky Hoa of the South Vietnam.

Several Philippine soldiers have been stationed on the island since 1968 when the Philippines occupied it. There are only a few structures, which serve as shelters for the soldiers.

The cay is under observation from a tall structure on the island, and the Philippine soldiers also regularly visit it.

These are unoccupied features, but are also largely controlled by the Philippines.

See also
List of maritime features in the Spratly Islands
Policies, activities and history of the Philippines in Spratly Islands

References

External links
Asia Maritime Transparency Initiative Island Tracker
NGA Chart 93044 shows the area NW of Dangerous Ground

Islands of the Spratly Islands
Kalayaan, Palawan
Loaita Bank